Lesser Poland Voivodeship or Lesser Poland Province (in  ), also known as Małopolska, is a voivodeship (province), in southern Poland.

It was created on 1 January 1999 out of the former Kraków, Tarnów, Nowy Sącz and parts of Bielsko-Biała, Katowice, Kielce and Krosno Voivodeships, pursuant to the Polish local government reforms adopted in 1998. The province's name recalls the traditional name of a historic Polish region, Lesser Poland, or in Polish: Małopolska. Current Lesser Poland Voivodeship, however, covers only a small part of the broader ancient Małopolska region which, together with Greater Poland (Wielkopolska) and Silesia (Śląsk), formed the early medieval Polish state. Historic Lesser Poland is much larger than the current province. It stretches far north, to Radom, and Siedlce, also including such cities, as Stalowa Wola, Lublin, Kielce, Częstochowa, and Sosnowiec.

The province is bounded on the north by the Świętokrzyskie Mountains (Góry Świętokrzyskie), on the west by Jura Krakowsko-Częstochowska (a broad range of hills stretching from Kraków to Częstochowa), and on the south by the Tatra,
Pieniny and Beskidy Mountains. Politically it is bordered by Silesian Voivodeship to the west, Świętokrzyskie Voivodeship to the north, Subcarpathian Voivodeship to the east, and Slovakia (Prešov Region and Žilina Regions) to the south.

Almost all of Lesser Poland lies in the Vistula River catchment area. The city of Kraków was one of the European Cities of Culture in 2000. Kraków has railway and road connections with Katowice (expressway), Warsaw, Wrocław and Rzeszów. It lies at the crossroads of major international routes linking Dresden with Kyiv, and Gdańsk with Budapest. Located here is the second largest international airport in Poland (after Warsaw's), the John Paul II International Airport.

Economy
The gross domestic product (GDP) of the province was 40.4 billion € in 2018, accounting for 8.1% of the Polish economic output. GDP per capita adjusted for purchasing power was €19,700 or 65% of the EU27 average in the same year. The GDP per employee was 72% of the EU average.

The region's economy includes high technology, banking, chemical and metallurgical industries, coal, ore, food processing, and spirit and tobacco industries. The most industrialized city of the voivodeship is Kraków. The largest regional enterprise operates here, the Tadeusz Sendzimir Steelworks in Nowa Huta, employing 17,500 people. Another major industrial center is located in the west, in the neighborhood of Chrzanów (chiefly the production of railway engines) and Oświęcim (chemical works). Kraków Park Technologiczny, a special economic zone, has been established within the voivodeship. There are almost 210,000 registered economic entities operating in the voivodeship, mostly small and medium-sized, of which 234 belong to the state-owned sector. Foreign investment, growing in the region, reached approximately US$18.3 billion by the end of 2006.

Universities
A total of 130,000 students attend fifteen Kraków institutions of higher learning. The Jagiellonian University, the largest university in the city (44,200 students), was founded in 1364 as Cracow Academy. Nicolaus Copernicus and Karol Wojtyła (Pope John Paul II) graduated from it. The AGH University of Science and Technology (29,800 students) is considered to be the best technical university in Poland. The Academy of Economics, the Pedagogical University, the Kraków University of Technology and the Agricultural Academy are also very highly regarded. There are also the Fine Arts Academy, the State Theatre University and the Musical Academy. Nowy Sącz has become a major educational center in the region thanks to its Higher School of Business and Administration, with an American curriculum, founded in 1992. The school has 4,500 students. There are also two private higher schools in Tarnów.

Climate

The city of Tarnów, which is located in Lesser Poland, is the hottest place in Poland all year round, average temperatures being around  during the day in the three summer months and  during the day in the three winter months. Błędów Desert, the only desert in Poland, is located in Lesser Poland, where temperatures can often reach  in the summer.

Tourism

Four national parks and numerous reserves have been established in the voivodeship to protect the environment of Lesser Poland. The region has areas for tourism and recreation, including Zakopane (Poland's most popular winter resort) and the Tatra, Pieniny and Beskidy Mountains. The natural landscape features many historic sites. The salt mine at Wieliczka, the pilgrimage town of Kalwaria Zebrzydowska, and Kraków's Old Town are ranked by UNESCO among the most precious sites of world heritage. At Wadowice, birthplace of John Paul II (50 kilometers southwest of Kraków) is a museum dedicated to the late pope's childhood. The area of Oświęcim, with the former Nazi concentration camps Auschwitz-I and Auschwitz-II-Birkenau, as well as the Auschwitz Jewish Center, is visited annually by a million people. Another tourist destination is the town of Bochnia with its salt mine, Europe's oldest.

List of cities and towns

The voivodeship contains 4 cities and 58 towns. These are listed below in descending order of population (according to official figures for 2019):

Administrative division
Lesser Poland Voivodeship is divided into 22 counties (powiats): 3 city counties and 19 land counties. These are further divided into 182 gminas.

The counties are listed in the following table (ordering within categories is by decreasing population).

Protected areas

Protected areas in Lesser Poland Voivodeship include six National Parks and 11 Landscape Parks. These are listed below.
 Babia Góra National Park (a UNESCO-designated biosphere reserve)
 Gorce National Park
 Magura National Park (partly in Subcarpathian Voivodeship)
 Ojców National Park
 Pieniny National Park
 Tatra National Park (part of a UNESCO biosphere reserve shared with Slovakia)
 Bielany-Tyniec Landscape Park
 Ciężkowice-Rożnów Landscape Park
 Dłubnia Landscape Park
 Eagle Nests Landscape Park (partly in Silesian Voivodeship)
 Kraków Valleys Landscape Park
 Little Beskids Landscape Park (partly in Silesian Voivodeship)
 Pasmo Brzanki Landscape Park (partly in Subcarpathian Voivodeship)
 Poprad Landscape Park
 Rudno Landscape Park
 Tenczynek Landscape Park
 Wiśnicz-Lipnica Landscape Park

Symbols
Lesser Poland Voivodeship's symbols can be blazoned as follows:

Coat of arms: 
A traditional Iberian shield gules, an eagle argent displayed armed, legged, beaked, langued and crowned Or.

Flag:
Per fess argent and gules, a narrow fess Or.

Most popular surnames in the region
 Nowak: 23,671
 Wójcik: 13,347
 Zając: 10,206

International relations
The Lesser Poland Voivodeships has partnerships with the following regions:

Thuringia (Germany)
Auvergne-Rhône-Alpes (France)
Prešov Region (Slovakia)
Žilina Region (Slovakia)
Lviv Oblast (Ukraine)
Cluj County (Romania)
Sverdlovsk Oblast (Russia)
Latgale, (Latvia)
Jiangsu, (China)
Andhra Pradesh, (India)
Uppsala County, (Sweden)
Kurdistan Region, (Iraq)
Istria County, (Croatia)
Adjara, (Georgia)

In February 2020, the French region of Centre-Val de Loire suspended its partnership with the Lesser Poland Voivodeship as a response to the anti-LGBT resolution passed by the voivodeship's authorities. In September 2021, the voivodeships's authorities revoked the controversial declaration.

See also
 Lesser Polish Way
 Second Polish Republic's Kraków Voivodeship (1919–1939)

Notes

References

 Małopolskie Voivodship Official Site
 Photo- and Topographic Maps of the whole region
 Poland - Climate
 Agency for Regional Development of Lesser Poland - MARR
 Tourism Information of Małopolskie Voivodship
 Małopolska Province invites
 Photos of Krakow, Tatry, Zakopane
 Info about the Smaller Poland - Malopolska Province

 
1999 establishments in Poland
Rusyn communities
States and territories established in 1999